Eulepidotis ornatoides is a moth of the family Erebidae first described by Robert W. Poole in 1989. It is found in the Neotropics, including Costa Rica and Bolivia.

References

Moths described in 1989
ornatoides